Leah Pinsent (born September 20, 1968) is a Canadian television and film actress.

Career
Pinsent made her film debut in 1984's The Bay Boy, best known as Kiefer Sutherland's first film. The role garnered her a Genie nomination for Best Supporting Actress. Her next role was in the 1986 horror film April Fool's Day alongside Thomas F. Wilson and Griffin O'Neal. 

She is perhaps best known for her television roles as production accountant Veronica Miller in the comedy-drama series Made in Canada, and news anchor Diane Gordon in More Tears and Escape from the Newsroom.

Personal life
Pinsent was born in Toronto, Ontario, to Canadian actors Gordon Pinsent and Charmion King. She was married to Michael Capellupo from 1991 to 2002. Pinsent is married to actor Peter Keleghan.

Filmography

Film

Television

References

External links
 

1968 births
Actresses from Toronto
Canadian film actresses
Canadian television actresses
Canadian voice actresses
Living people